Vikruthamala is an outgrowth suburb of Tirupati. It is a part of Tirupati urban agglomeration and located in the Tirupati district of Andhra pradesh, India. It falls in the jurisdictional limit of Tirupati Urban Development Authority.

Tirupati
Tirupati district